Darwinia may refer to:
Darwinia (plant) Rudge 1815, a genus of Myrtaceae found only in Australia
Darwinia Raf., a synonym of the legume genus Sesbania Adans.
Darwinia (video game), a 2005 video game by Introversion Software
Darwinia (novel), a 1998 novel by Robert Charles Wilson

See also 
Darwinius, an extinct primate